Philobota ellenella is a moth of the family Oecophoridae. It is known from the Australian Capital Territory, New South Wales and Victoria.

References

Oecophorinae
Moths described in 1856